La que se avecina is a Spanish television situation comedy created by Alberto Caballero, Laura Caballero and Daniel Deorador.

Series overview

Season 1 (2007)

Season 2 (2008)

Season 3 (2009)

Season 4 (2010)

Season 5 (2011)

Season 6 (2012–13)

Season 7 (2013–14)

Season 8 (2014–15)

Season 9 (2015-16)

Season 10 (2017)

Season 11

Season 12

Special episodes
 Special Episode 01 - Las mejores tomas falsas de la serie (The best false captures of the series): False Captures
 Special Episode 02 - The very best of Montepinar, Volumen 1 (The very best of Montepinar, 1st Episode): False Captures
 Special Episode 03 - The very best of Montepinar, Volumen 2 (The very best of Montepinar, 2nd Episode): False Captures
 Special Episode 04 - The very best of Montepinar, Volumen 3 (The very best of Montepinar, 3rd Episode): False Captures
 Special Episode 05 - El breaking of (The breaking of): False Captures
 Special Episode 06 - ¡Qué campanadas se avecinan! (What end of year approaches): It was a special episode that was issued between 23:45 of December 31, 2012 up to them 00:15 hours of January 1, 2013. Only it possessed Pablo Chiapella (Amador Rivas), Jordi Sanchez (Antonio Recio) and Vanesa Romero (Raquel Villanueva) like index, in addition, also operated Cristina Medina (Nines Chacón) as secondary personage.
 Special Episode 07 -Tomas falsas a cascoporro (False captures to heaps): False Captures
 Special Episode 08 - Salami, huevones, mandangas y tomas falsas (Salami, huevones, sluggishnesses and false captures): False Captures
 Special Episode 09 - Shaking of de La que se avecina (Shaking of La Que Se Avecina): A special program about the index
 Special Episode 10 - Gracias por hacernos reír (Homenaje a Mariví Bilbao)'' (Thank you for making us laugh (honoring Mariví Bilbao)): On April 3, 2013 Mariví Bilbao died, aged 83, the actress recorded more than 70 episodes, and left the series a few months before her death. On the same night, Factoría de Ficcióm (the channel that broad casts La que se Avecina) broadcast this special with two episodes in which her character has major roles.

Hoy se nos avecina

Today it us approaches is a special season that is issued nowadays every Monday in FDF. The spectators of the series send question Internet route to the prominent figures and they answer them. On April 8, 2013 Mariví Bilbao's episode was going to be issued, only five days after her death.

This special season began to be issued on February 11, 2013 and June 17, 2013.

 Episode 01 - Hoy se nos avecina... Amador Rivas
 Episode 02 - Hoy se nos avecina... Enrique Pastor
 Episode 03 - Hoy se nos avecina... Nines
 Episode 04 - Hoy se nos avecina... Coque
 Episode 05 - Hoy se nos avecina... Antonio Recio
 Episode 06 - Hoy se nos avecina... Javier Maroto
 Episode 07 - Hoy se nos avecina... Araceli
 Episode 08 - Hoy se nos avecina... Estela Reynolds
 Episode 09 - Hoy se nos avecina... Especial Mariví Bilbao
 Episode 10 - Hoy se nos avecina... Leo
 Episode 11 - Hoy se nos avecina... Berta
 Episode 12 - Hoy se nos avecina... Raquel
 Episode 13 - Hoy se nos avecina... Fran
 Episode 14 - Hoy se nos avecina... Vicente
 Episode 16 - Hoy se nos avecina... Maxi
 Episode 17 - Hoy se nos avecina... Maite
 Episode 17 - Hoy se nos avecina... Fermín
 Episode 18 - Hoy se nos avecina... Lola
 Episode 19 - Hoy se nos avecina... Judith

Music
 Mandanga Style by Amador Rivas

La que se avecina